Destined to be Yours is a 2017 Philippine television drama romance comedy broadcast by GMA Network. Directed by Irene Villamor, it stars Alden Richards and Maine Mendoza. It premiered on February 27, 2017 on the network's Telebabad line up replacing Alyas Robin Hood. The series concluded on May 26, 2017 with a total of 63 episodes. It was replaced by My Love from the Star in its timeslot.

The series is streaming online on YouTube.

Premise
The story revolves around Benjie and Sinag. When Benjie gets assigned to a job project in Pelangi, he meets Sinag. They both end up falling in love with each other.

Cast and characters

Lead cast
 Alden Richards as Benjamin "Benjie / Benj" Rosales
 Maine Mendoza as Sinag "DJ Sunshine / DJ Madam Damin" Obispo

Supporting cast
 Boots Anson-Roa as Helen Rosales
 Gardo Versoza as Teddy Obispo
 Lotlot de Leon as Amanda Rosales
 Tommy Abuel as Vicente Rosales III
 Ronnie Henares as Dante Escobar
 Sheena Halili as Ninay Baltazar
 Ina Feleo as Catalina Rosales 
 Dominic Roco as Jason Abesamis
 Juancho Trivino as Badong Baltazar
 RJ Padilla as Arman Melendez
 Koreen Medina as Marjorie Escobar
 Janice de Belen as Sally Obispo

Recurring cast
 Will Ashley de Leon as Sol Obispo
 Kim Belles as Tala Obispo
 Ervic Vijandre as Elton Vasquez
 Thea Tolentino as Patricia "Trish" Villanueva 
 Jackie Lou Blanco as Ramona Villanueva

Guest cast
 Luz Valdez as Delia
 Lou Veloso as Elvis
 Matthew Mendoza as Gabriel
 Joe Gruta as Doro
 Nova Villa as Puring
 Mark Herras as Eboy
 Marita Zobel as Charito
 Marco Sison as Ka Henry
 Lee Danes as Clarissa
 Nicole Dulalia as Tina 
 Tonio Quiazon as Lakay
 Chromewell Cosio as Rex
 Meann Espinosa as Teresing
 Sachi Manahan as Affie
 Sofia Pablo as Lala
 Divine Aucina as Tetay
 Marnie Lapuz as Bem
 Maey Bautista as Mema
 Tammy Brown as Mamaru
 Kim Rodriguez as Fiona
 James Teng as James

Episodes

February 2017

March 2017

April 2017

May 2017

Production
In August 2016, Alden Richards stated that their series with Maine Mendoza was in the works. While GMA Films President, Annette Gozon-Abrogar said that the upcoming series was the "network's top priority". She further mentioned that the long process was due to the several concepts being submitted and was in need of approval by both of Richard's and Mendoza's managements, GMA Artist Center and Triple A respectively.

The story conference happened on December 12, 2016 at the GMA Executive Lounge, in which the show's title and the director were revealed. The cast, production team and GMA Network's executives were present at the conference.

Principal photography commenced on December 21, 2016 in Quezon province with Richards started his first filming day while Mendoza started on January 5, 2017 with Gardo Versoza and Janice de Belen.

Ratings
According to AGB Nielsen Philippines' Nationwide Urban Television Audience Measurement, the pilot episode of Destined to be Yours earned a 22.5% rating. While the final episode scored a 10.8% rating on Nationwide Urban Television Audience Measurement People in television homes. The series had its highest rating on April 10, 2017 with an 11.6% rating.

References

External links
 
 

2017 Philippine television series debuts
2017 Philippine television series endings
Filipino-language television shows
GMA Network drama series
Philippine romantic comedy television series
Television shows set in the Philippines